Karosa C 735 is an intercity bus produced by bus manufacturer Karosa from the Czech Republic, in the years 1992 to 1997. It was succeeded by Karosa C 935 in 1997.

Construction features 
Karosa C 735 is model of Karosa 700 series. C 735 is based on Karosa C 734. Body is semi-self-supporting with frame and engine with manual gearbox in the rear part. Only rear axle is propulsed. Front axle is independent, rear axle is solid. All axles are mounted on air suspension. On the right side are two doors. Inside are used leatherette seats. Drivers cab is not separated from the rest of the vehicle.

Production and operation 
In the year 1992 started serial production, which continued until 1997.

Currently, number of Karosa C734 buses is decreasing, due to high age of buses.

Historical vehicles

See also 

 List of buses

Buses manufactured by Karosa
Buses of the Czech Republic